Yoo Hye-min (born 6 April 1981) is a South Korean alpine skier. She competed in the women's giant slalom at the 2002 Winter Olympics. Yoo went to Cheongju Girls' High School. She won a gold medal in the 1999 Asian Winter Games.

References

External links
 

1981 births
Living people
South Korean female alpine skiers
Olympic alpine skiers of South Korea
Alpine skiers at the 2002 Winter Olympics
Place of birth missing (living people)
Asian Games medalists in alpine skiing
Asian Games gold medalists for South Korea
Asian Games silver medalists for South Korea
Asian Games bronze medalists for South Korea
Alpine skiers at the 1999 Asian Winter Games
Alpine skiers at the 2003 Asian Winter Games
Medalists at the 1999 Asian Winter Games
21st-century South Korean women